Jain philosophy explains that seven tattva (truths or fundamental principles) constitute reality. These are:— 
jīva- the soul which is characterized by consciousness
ajīva- the non-soul
āsrava (influx)- inflow of auspicious and evil karmic matter into the soul.
bandha (bondage)- mutual intermingling of the soul and karmas.
samvara (stoppage)- obstruction of the inflow of karmic matter into the soul.
nirjara (gradual dissociation)- separation or falling-off of part of karmic matter from the soul.
mokṣha (liberation)- complete annihilation of all karmic matter (bound with any particular soul).

The knowledge of these reals is said to be essential for the liberation of the soul.

However, as per one sect of Jain i.e. Shwetamber (Sthanakwasi), there are total nine tattva (truths or fundamental principles).

Seven tattva are same as above but 2 more tattva are there namely:

Overview 
The first two are the two ontological categories of the soul jīva and the non-soul ajīva, namely the axiom that they exist. The third truth is that through the interaction, called yoga, between the two substances, soul and non-soul, karmic matter flows into the soul (āsrava), clings to it, becomes converted into karma and the fourth truth acts as a factor of bondage (bandha), restricting the manifestation of the consciousness intrinsic to it. The fifth truth states that a stoppage (saṃvara) of new karma is possible through asceticism through practice of right conduct, faith and knowledge. An intensification of asceticism burns up the existing karma – this sixth truth is expressed by the word nirjarā. The final truth is that when the soul is freed from the influence of karma, it reaches the goal of Jaina teaching, which is liberation or mokṣa. In some texts punya or spiritual merit and papa or spiritual demerit are counted among the fundamental reals. But in major Jain texts like Tattvārthasūtra the number of tattvas is seven because both punya and papa are included in āsrava or bandha. According to the Jain text, Sarvārthasiddhi, translates S.A. Jain:

Jīva

Jainism believes that the souls (jīva) exist as a reality, having a separate existence from the body that houses it. Jīva is characterised by chetana (consciousness) and upayoga (knowledge and perception). Though the soul experiences both birth and death, it is neither really destroyed nor created. Decay and origin refer respectively to the disappearing of one state of soul and appearance of another state, these being merely the modes of the soul.

Ajīva

Ajīva are the five non-living substances that make up the universe along with the jīva. They are:
Pudgala (Matter) –Matter is classified as solid, liquid, gaseous, energy, fine Karmic materials and extra-fine matter or ultimate particles. Paramānu or ultimate particles are considered the basic building block of all matter. One of the qualities of the Paramānu and Pudgala is that of permanence and indestructibility. It combines and changes its modes but its basic qualities remain the same. According to Jainism, it cannot be created nor destroyed.
Dharma-tattva (Medium of Motion) and Adharma-tattva (Medium of rest) – They are also known as Dharmāstikāya and Adharmāstikāya. They are unique to Jain thought depicting the principles of motion and rest. They are said to pervade the entire universe. Dharma-tattva and adharma-tattva are by themselves not motion or rest but mediate motion and rest in other bodies. Without dharmāstikāya motion is not possible and without adharmāstikāya rest is not possible in the universe.
Ākāśa (Space) – Space is a substance that accommodates souls, matter, the principle of motion, the principle of rest, and time. It is all-pervading, infinite and made of infinite space-points.
Kāla (Time) – Time is a real entity according to Jainism and all activities, changes or modifications can be achieved only through time. In Jainism, the time is likened to a wheel with twelve spokes divided into descending and ascending halves with six stages, each of immense duration estimated at billions of sagaropama or ocean years. According to Jains, sorrow increases at each progressive descending stage and happiness and bliss increase in each progressive ascending stage.

Āsrava

Asrava (influx of karma) refers to the influence of body and mind causing the soul to generate karma. It occurs when the karmic particles are attracted to the soul on account of vibrations created by activities of mind, speech and body. 

The āsrava, that is, the influx of karmic occurs when the karmic particles are attracted to the soul on account of vibrations created by activities of mind, speech and body. Tattvārthasūtra, 6:1–2 states: "The activities of body, speech and mind is called yoga. This three-fold action results in āsrava or influx of karma." 
The karmic inflow on account of yoga driven by passions and emotions cause a long term inflow of karma prolonging the cycle of reincarnations. On the other hand, the karmic inflows on account of actions that are not driven by passions and emotions have only a transient, short-lived karmic effect.

Bandha

The karmas have effect only when they are bound to the consciousness. This binding of the karma to the consciousness is called bandha. However, the yoga or the activities alone do not produce bondage. Out of the many causes of bondage, passion is considered as the main cause of bondage. The karmas are literally bound on account of the stickiness of the soul due to existence of various passions or mental dispositions.

Saṃvara

Saṃvara is stoppage of karma. The first step to emancipation or the realization of the self is to see that all channels through which karma has been flowing into the soul have been stopped, so that no additional karma can accumulate. This is referred to as the stoppage of the inflow of karma (saṃvara). There are two kinds of saṃvara: that which is concerned with mental life (bhava-saṃvara), and that which refers to the removal of karmic particles (dravya- saṃvara). This stoppage is possible by self-control and freedom from attachment. The practice of vows, carefulness, self-control, observance of ten kinds of dharma, meditation, and the removal of the various obstacles, such as hunger, thirst, and passion stops the inflow of karma and protect the soul from the impurities of fresh karma.

Nirjarā

Nirjarā is the shedding or destruction of karmas that has already accumulated. Nirjarā is of two types: the psychic aspect
of the removal of karma (bhāva-nirjarā) and destruction of the particles of
karma (dravya-nirjarā). Karma may exhaust itself in its natural course when its fruits are completely exhausted. In this, no effort is required. The remaining karma has to be removed by means of penance (avipaka-nirjarā). The soul is like a mirror which looks dim when the dust of karma is deposited on its surface. When karma is removed by destruction, the soul shines in its pure and transcendent form. It then attains the goal of mokṣa.

Mokṣha
 

Mokṣha means liberation, salvation or emancipation of soul. As per Jainism, Mokṣha is the attainment of an altogether different state of the soul, completely free from the karmic bondage, free from samsara (the cycle of birth and death). It means the removal of all the impurities of karmic matter and the body, characterized by the inherent qualities of the soul such as knowledge and bliss free from pain and suffering. Right faith, right knowledge, and right conduct (together) constitute the path to liberation. A liberated soul is said to have attained its true and pristine nature of infinite bliss, infinite knowledge and infinite perception. In Jainism, it is the highest and the noblest objective that a soul should strive to achieve. It fact, it is the only objective that a person should have; other objectives are contrary to the true nature of soul.

See also
Jain Philosophy
Jain Cosmology

References

Citations

Sources
 
 

Jain philosophical concepts
Classical elements